General Sir Arthur John Archer, KCB, OBE (12 February 1924 – 12 March 1999) was a senior officer of the British Army and a former Commander in Chief, UK Land Forces.

Army career
Educated at King's School, Peterborough, and St. Catharine's College, Cambridge, John Archer was commissioned into the Royal Norfolk Regiment in 1944. He transferred to the Devon and Dorset Regiment in 1946 and served with the Regiment during the Malayan Emergency. He was Commanding Officer of 1 Bn Devon and Dorset Regiment from 1965 to 1967. He then went on to command British Land Forces in The Gulf from 1968 to 1969. He was General Officer Commanding 2nd Division from 1972 to 1974. He was then Director Army Staff Duties at the Ministry of Defence from 1974 to 1976 and Commander of British Forces in Hong Kong from 1976 to 1978.

He served as the Commander in Chief, UK Land Forces, from 1978 to 1980 when he retired.

Later career
In retirement, he was a Director of The Hongkong and Shanghai Banking Corporation and Chief Executive of The Royal Hong Kong Jockey Club.

References

|-

|-
 

|-

1924 births
1999 deaths
British Army generals
Knights Commander of the Order of the Bath
Officers of the Order of the British Empire
Royal Norfolk Regiment officers
Devonshire and Dorset Regiment officers
People from Fakenham
Dorset Regiment officers
British Army personnel of the Malayan Emergency
People educated at The King's School, Peterborough
British Army personnel of World War II